Per Kasten Samuel Antell  (12 May 1845, Helsinki – 20 July 1906) was a Finnish politician and colonel. He was a member of the Senate of Finland.

1845 births
1906 deaths
Politicians from Helsinki
People from Uusimaa Province (Grand Duchy of Finland)
Finnish military personnel
Finnish senators
Members of the Diet of Finland